Nut is the seventh studio album by Scottish singer-songwriter KT Tunstall, and the third and final album in the "soul, body and mind" trilogy. It was released on 9 September 2022, following the first two albums of the trilogy, Kin and Wax. The first songs released from the album were "Canyons", "I Am the Pilot" and the lead single "Private Eyes".

Background 
Tunstall announced the release of Nut on 28 May 2022, completing her trilogy of albums based on "soul, body and mind", with Nut being about the mind. Tunstall started working on the record during the 2020 COVID-19 pandemic lockdown, alongside writing music for a musical. 

The album was written and recorded during a profound period of change for Tunstall, including hearing loss, heightened self-awareness, love and a global pandemic.

The album artwork was created by Josh McCartney. On naming the album, Tunstall declared "nut" is a word that refers to mind or brain in Scottish slang. She also states "I love that the word also means a seed – the album artwork is all about the brain being a garden; you reap what you sow, you need to keep the weeds at bay, and there is an almost supernatural beauty to when things blossom".

Tunstall released three singles from the album prior to its release: "Canyons", "I Am the Pilot" and the lead single "Private Eyes" – a true story "of a starlet lost in her own fame, and my getting a glimpse of her gilded prison..." A music video was released for each single.

Tunstall announced her first UK tour since the pandemic to accompany the album, including shows in York, Manchester, London, Edinburgh and Glasgow.

Critical reception 
Neil Z. Yeung of AllMusic cited two of the singles, "I Am the Pilot" and "Canyons" as highlights, as well as the album opener "Out of Touch" and "Synapse".

John Apice from American Highways described Tunstall's vocals as "sumptuous" and mentioned the songs "tease with danceable energy & keep the commercial silliness in check". His highlights include "Dear Shadow", "Demigod" and "All the Time".

Track listing 
All tracks produced by Martin Terefe, except where noted.

Personnel 
 KT Tunstall – vocals, guitars, bass guitar, keyboards, synths, programming
 Martin Terefe – bass guitar, guitars, synths, piano, backing vocals

Charts

References 

2022 albums
KT Tunstall albums
EMI Records albums
Sequel albums